The 2011–12 season was Annan Athletic's fourth consecutive season in the Scottish Third Division, having been admitted to the Scottish Football League at the start of the 2008–09 season. Annan also competed in the Challenge Cup, League Cup and Scottish Cup.

Summary
Annan finished sixth in the Third Division. They reached the semi final of the Challenge Cup, the first round of the League Cup and the third round of the Scottish Cup.

Results & fixtures

Third Division

Challenge Cup

League Cup

Scottish Cup

Player statistics

Squad 
Last updated 5 May 2012 

 
 
 

|}

Disciplinary record 
Includes all competitive matches.
Last updated 5 May 2012

Awards

Last updated 21 December 2011

League table

Transfers

Players in

Players out

See also
List of Annan Athletic F.C. seasons

Notes

Annan Athletic F.C. seasons
Annan Athletic